Edward Winsor Kemble (January 18, 1861 – September 19, 1933), usually cited as E. W. Kemble, and sometimes referred to incorrectly as Edward Windsor Kemble, was an American illustrator. He is known best for illustrating the first edition of Adventures of Huckleberry Finn and for his caricatures of African Americans.

Biography 

Kemble was born in Sacramento, California. In 1875, he was enrolled at a boarding school in Philadelphia, which was a center of artistic activity. His artistic talent was such that he was a successful contributor to periodicals by 1881. He became the major political cartoonist for the New York Daily Graphic while receiving his only formal artistic training at the Art Students League of New York.

When Life magazine was founded in 1883, Kemble became a frequent contributor to its early issues. He was a staff political cartoonist for Collier's from 1903 to 1907, for Harper's Weekly from 1907 to 1912 before returning to Collier's, and for Leslie's Weekly and Judge in the late 1910s.

His lively cartoons, some of the magazine industry's most mature work, attracted the attention of Mark Twain, who employed Kemble to illustrate Adventures of Huckleberry Finn. Kemble subsequently illustrated several other famous books, including Twain's Puddin' Head Wilson, Harriet Beecher Stowe's Uncle Tom's Cabin, Washington Irving's Knickerbocker History of New York, and many of Joel Chandler Harris' Uncle Remus stories.

Kemble illustrated three books authored by Eldred Kurtz Means.

Kemble lived in the Rochelle Park area of suburban New Rochelle.

He died in Ridgefield, Connecticut, in 1933, aged 72.

References

Sources

Horn, Maurice, ed. The World Encyclopedia of Cartoons. 2d ed. Philadelphia: Chelsea House Publishers, 1999.
Reed, Walt. The Illustrator in America, 1860–2000. New York: The Society of Illustrators, 2001.
Samuels, Peggy, and Harold Samuels. Samuels' Encyclopedia of Artists of the American West. Secaucus, N.J.: Castle, 1985.

External links

 
 
 Comic Creator: E. W. Kemble via lambiek.net
 Kemble, E.W. (February 1930). Illustrating Huckleberry Finn. The Colophon, A Book Collectors' Quarterly (via University of Virginia)
 Kemble's Illustrations for Huck Finn (via University of Virginia)
  (mainly as "E. W. Kemble")
Stuart A. Rose Manuscript, Archives, and Rare Book Library, Emory University: Letters to Ellis D. Robb, 1931

1861 births
1933 deaths
American cartoonists
Artists from New Rochelle, New York
Artists from Sacramento, California
Art Students League of New York alumni